Pitcairnia sceptrigera is a plant species in the genus Pitcairnia. This species is native to Ecuador.

References

sceptrigera
Flora of Ecuador